Clarendon School District 6  is a school district based in Clarendon, Arkansas, United States. The school district supports more than 550 students and employs more than 110 educators and staff for its two schools and district offices.

CSD encompasses  of land in Monroe County and Prairie County.

History
In 1966 the Arkansas County School District dissolved, with portions going to the Clarendon school district.

On July 1, 2004, the Holly Grove School District was merged into the Clarendon School District.

Schools 
 Clarendon Elementary School, serving prekindergarten through grade 6.
 Clarendon High School, serving grades 7 through 12.

References

Further reading
 (Download)

External links
 

Education in Monroe County, Arkansas
School districts in Arkansas